Conneautville is a borough in Crawford County, Pennsylvania, United States, situated along Conneaut Creek. The population was 737 at the 2020 census, down from 774 at the 2010 census.

History
Conneautville was founded in 1814 by Alexander Power, a surveyor and engineer. Conneautville was first called "Powerstown" or made reference to as "Power's Tract". Power wanted it called "Conneautville" after the Seneca name Conneaut or Conneautee, meaning "Snow Place" according to one interpretation.

Geography
Conneautville is in northwestern Crawford County at  (41.758019, -80.369470), in the valley of Conneaut Creek, which flows north and west to Lake Erie. The borough is bordered by Spring Township to the north and Summerhill Township to the south.

Pennsylvania Route 18 passes through the center of the borough, leading north  to Albion and south  to Conneaut Lake. Pennsylvania Route 198 leads west from Conneautville  to the Ohio border and east  to Interstate 79 near Saegertown.

Demographics

At the census of 2000, there were 848 people, 352 households and 229 families in the borough. The population density was 778.7 per square mile (300.4/km2). There were 377 housing units at an average of 346.2 per square mile (133.5/km2). The racial makeup was 98.47% White, 0.24% African American, 0.24% Native American, 0.12% Asian, 0.12% from other races, and 0.83% from two or more races. Hispanic or Latino of any race were 0.59% of the population.

There were 352 households, of which 30.1% had children under 18 with them, 52.0% were married couples living together, 8.2% had a female householder with no husband present, and 34.7% were non-families. 30.7% of all households were made up of individuals, and 17.3% had someone living alone 65 or older. The average household size was 2.41 and the average family size 3.03.

In the borough 24.6% were under 18, 6.6% from 18 to 24, 28.7% from 25 to 44, 22.4% from 45 to 64, and 17.7% 65 or older. The median was 40. For every 100 females there were 88.9 males. For every 100 females age 18 and over, there were 85.8 males.

The median household income was $35,083, and the median family income was $40,833. Males had a median income of $30,481 versus $19,583 for females. The per capita income for the borough was $17,087. 4.1% of families and 7.4% of the population were below the poverty line, including 10.0% of those under 18 and 11.9% of those 65 or over.

Notable person 
Effie Louise Power (1873–1969), a children's librarian, educator, author and storyteller was born in Conneautville.

References

Populated places established in 1814
Boroughs in Crawford County, Pennsylvania
1814 establishments in Pennsylvania